The term Brick Gothic is used for what more specifically is called Baltic Brick Gothic or North German Brick Gothic. That part of Gothic architecture, widespread in Northern Germany, Denmark, Poland and the Baltic states, is commonly identified with the sphere of influence of the Hanseatic League. But there is a continuous mega-region of Gothic brick architecture, or Brick Gothic in a sense based on the facts, from the Strait of Dover to Finland and Lake Peipus and to the Sub-Carpathian region of southeastern Poland and southwestern Ukraine.

Out of northern Germany and the Baltic region, the term Brick Gothic is adequately applied as well.

The region around the Baltic Sea, including Northern Germany, has some typical characteristics, but there are also regional and social differences, such as between the churches of medieval big cities and those of the neighbouring villages. On the other hand, a significant number of Gothic brick buildings erected near the Baltic Sea could also have been built in the Netherlands or in Flanders, and vice versa.

Furthermore, Gothic brick structures have also been erected in other regions, such as northern Italy, southwestern and central France, and in the Danubian area of southern Germany. The particular architectural styles of some regions differ very much from the others, these are Italian Gothic (with Lombard Gothic, Venetian Gothic and Tuscan Gothic), French Gothique Méridional. Quite late began the medieval use of brick in England, with the Tudor Style.

The true extent of northern Brick Gothic and other Gothic brick architecture is shown by this almost complete list.

Lists 

This list will never be complete. But it aims to be almost complete to give an unbiased survey as well on the variance as on the geography of Gothic brick buildings.

The dates given here refer to the present extant Gothic structures. Predecessors or post-Gothic alterations are not normally mentioned, but can be assessed by following up the literature. The most influential structures are indicated by bold print. Romanesque and Renaissance structures are not listed. Gothic Brick structures from outside the Baltic or North German regions, e.g. the Danubian ones, are also included, while Neogothic edifices are not listed.

– In long tables, vertical arrows link to the navigation boards above (after the preceding table) and below (before the next table). –

Belarus

Belgium 

Public database links: 
 IBE = Inventaris Bouwkundig Erfgoed (Inventory of Architectural Heritage)

Most of the Gothic brick architecture in Belgium can be found in West Flanders, some in a narrow strip along the border with the Netherlands. Many Gothic brick churches in the Province of Limburg have been lost in the 19th century, as they were displaced by Gothic Revival churches.

West Flanders

East Flanders

Province of Antwerp

Limburg

Hainaut

Flemish Brabant, Walloon Brabant & Brussels

Czech Republic

Denmark 
Background informations:
 NM-DK = Digitized pages, available on the websites of the National Museum, of the compendium of Danmarks Kirker ("Churches of Denmark"). It has been published since 1927, but the digitized pages mostly are of editions of the 1990s. On the linked subpage, you have to cklick for a PDF with the title "… Kirke". The description you load down begins with some history. After that, the churchyard is described and after the churchyard, mostly beginning with the headline "BYGNING", the church building itself. In this list, sometimes simply is written "PDF", sometimes an identification of the volume and the number "BYGNING"-page. 
 Trap = Statistik-Topographisk Beskrivelse af Kongeriket Danmark (Statistical-Topographical Description of the Kingdom of Denmark, initiated by Jens Peter Trap (DA) and continued by H. Weitemeyer, V. Falbe-Hansen & H. Westergaard. The 1st edition 1856–1860, 2nd edition 1872–1879 & 3rd edition 1898–1906 are available on Runeberg edition of Nordic literature. As a non-commercial volunteer project providing original texts, it can be considered equivalent to Wikisource.

North Jutland 
– Danish "Region Nordjylland" –

{|class="wikitable"  style="border:2px; width:100%;"
|-
! ↕ !! Place !! Building !! time of construction !! Notes !! style="width:100px;"| Image
|-
|↓|| rowspan="2" style="vertical-align:top;"|Aalborg|| Budolfi Church|| about 1450||northern chapel and 14 meters of the choir 1942–1944 ||
|-
|↓||Aalborg Monastery (DA)||this wing 1506|| ||
|-
|↓||Bislev,Aalborg Kommune||Bislev church (DA)||||Romanesque nave of granite, white washed Gothic tower of brick ||
|-
|↑||Ferslev,Aalborg Kommune||Ferslev church (DA)|||| Romanesque nave of granite, white washed Gothic tower of brick ||
|-
|↓||Frejlev,Aalborg Kommune||Frejlev kirke||nave 12th century|| Romanesque nave of granite, white washed Gothic tower of brick||
|-
|↑||Hals,Aalborg Kommune||Hals church (DA)|| ||choir Late Gothic, tower Late Gothic & later heightened  ||
|-
|↓||with proviso for lackingdata: Klarup,Aalborg Kommune||Klarup church|| || ||
|-
|↑||Nibe,Aalborg Kommune||Nibe church (DA)|| 15th century|| ||
|-
|↓||Nørre Tranders,Aalborg Kommune||Nørre Tranders church (DA)|||| granite & brick||
|-
|↑||Sejlflod,Aalborg Kommune||Sejlflod church (DA)||brick 16th century|| ||
|-
|↓||Storvorde,Aalborg Kommune||Storvorde church|| 14th century or later|| ||
|-
|↑||Sønder Tranders,Aalborg Kommune||Sønder Tranders church (DA)||||tower & alterations of the nave Late Gothic of brick, washed ||
|-
|↓||Sønderholm,Aalborg Kommune||Sønderholm church (DA)||||tower & porch LateGothic of brick, washed ||
|-
|↑||Vester Hassing,Aalborg Kommune||Vester Hassing church (DA)|| tower 15th century|| ||
|-
|↓||Tise,Brønderslev Kommune||Tise church (DA)||||Late Gothic enlargement and modernization  ||
|-
|↑||Tolstrup,Brønderslev Kommune|Tolstrup kirke|| ||porch Late Gothic, tower replaced in 1937 ||
|-
|↓||near Voergaard Castle,Brønderslev Kommune||Voer Kirke (DA)||||Late Gothic choir and porch; tower 1788 ||
|-
|↑||Øster Brønderslev,Brønderslev Kommune||church (DA)||about 1250||nave & base of the tower of granite, tower of red brick, porch of washed biick ||
|-
|↓||Åsted,Frederikshavn Kommune||Åsted church <small>(DA)/(DE)</small>|| ||colspan="2"|

|-
|↑||Elling,Frederikshavn Kommune||Elling Kirke <small>(DA)/(DE)</small>|| 13th century||Romanesque & Gothic ||
|-
|↓||VolstrupFrederikshavn Kommune||Volstrup church (DA)|| th century||Late Romanesque (also brick) & Late Gothic; gables altered to Baroque style ||
|-
|↑||Skagen,Frederikshavn Kommune|| Sand-Covered Church|| btw. 13t5 & 1387||nave demolished in 1895 ||
|-
|↓||Hjørring||St Cathreine church (DA)|| Gothic 15th century||choir, tower & other additions to the Romensque nave (years on the tower from renovations)||
|-
|↑||Skallerup,Hjørring Kommune||Skallerup church (DA)|||| nave Romanesque, tower, sacrity & porch Late Gothic ||
|-
|↓||Vrensted,Hjørring Kommune||Vrensted church (DA)||||Late Gothic whitened brick tower; Romanesque nave of granite||
|-
|↑||Vrå,Hjørring Kommune||Vrå church (DA)||||Romensque nave with Late Gothic painted brick tower & porch ||
|-
|↓|||Alstrup,Jammerbugt Kom.||Alstrup church (DA)||||choir & tower Late Gothic of brick, whitened||
|-
|↑||Brovst,Jammerbugt Kom.||church (DA)|| Gothic 14th century||tower & porch of brick ||
|-
|↓||Gjøl,Jammerbugt Kom.||Gjøl church|| nave 1150||brick tower Gothic age||
|-
|↑||Haverslev,Jammerbugt Kom.||Haverslev church ||||Gothic tower of Romanesque granite church, renovation 1757, poor chronicle information ||
|-
|↓||Hune Sogn,Jammerbugt Kom.||Hune-/ Vor for Frue Kirke||||whitene Githic brikc tower, Romanesque (?) nave of granite||
|-
|↑||Ingstrup Sogn,Jammerbugt Kom.||Ingstrup church||||nave with romanesque walls of granit eashley and gothic vaults, whitened Gothic brick tower ||
|-
|↓||PandrupJammerbugt Kom.||church|| th century||colspan="2"|

|-
|↓||Kettrup,Jammerbugt Kom.||Kettrup church ||nave 12th century||tower and porch of brick in late Middel Age, renovation in 1801 ||
|-
|↑||Klim (DA),Jammerbugt Kom.||Klim church||nave 12th century||Romanesque granite church with Late Gothic whitened brick tower and further whitened brick additions ||
|-
|↓||Fjerritslev,Jammerbugt Kom.||Kollerup church||Gothic about 1500||Romanesque granite nave of 12th century ||
|-
|↑||Lerup sogn,Jammerbugt Kom.||Lerup church (DA)||tower mid 15th century|| Romanesque nave, Late Gothic whitened brick tower, younger porch ||
|-
|↓||near Brovst,Jammerbugt Kom.||Torslev church (DA)|| colspan="2"| Romanesque nave, Late Gothic tower; upper storey of the tower demolished in 1841 ||
|-
|↑||Tranum Sogn,Jammerbugt Kom.||Tranum Kirke|| colspan="2"| Romanesque nave about 1200, Late Gothic tower about 1450||
|-
|↓||Vester Hjermitslev Sogn,Jammerbugt Kom.||Vester Hjermitslev church (DA)|| Gothic about 1500||tower & relaunch of the nave by brick, whitened ||
|-
|↑||Vust,Jammerbugt Kom.||Vust church||tower about 1500||Romanesque granite nave, Gothic whitened brick tower ||
|-
|↓||Øland island,Jammerbugt Kom.||Øland- or Oxholm church (DA)||early 15th century||former nunnery church, yellow brick, nowadays white washed||
|-
|↑||Byrum,Læsø||Byrum church (DA)|| 1258||mainly Romanesque, but two Gothic windows and inside Gothic vaults ||
|-
|↓||Vesterø,Læsø||Southern Vesterø church (DA)|| about 1250||mainly Romanesque, tower Gothic ||
|-
|↑||Mariager,Mariagerfjiord Kom.|| Mariager Abbey church|| 15th century||former nunnery and pilgrimage ||
|-
|↓||Als |(DA),Mariagerfjiord Kom.||Als church (DA)|| 1309||white washed ||
|-
|↑||Astrup,Mariagerfjiord Kom.||Astrup church|| 1542||octagonal tower of red brick ||
|-
|↓|| rowspan="2" style="vertical-align:top;"|Falslev-Vindblæs sogn,Mariagerfjiord Kom.||Falslev kirke||colspan="2"|Romanesque nave of granite ashley, whitened brick tower & porch Late Gothic additions ||only granitephotos
|-
|↑||Vindblæs church||Brick about 1550||Late Gothic tower and porch ||
|-
|↓||Hvidberg,Mors island,Morsø Kommune||Hvidberg church|| tower about 1500||nave 12th century of granite ashley ||
|-
|↑||Nykøbing Mors,Mors|| Dueholm Priory|| founded 1370|| ||
|-
|↓||Sejerslev,Mors island,Morsø Kommune||church|| ||Romanesque granite church with Late Gothic whitened brick tower||
|-
|↑||Vejerslev,Mors island,Morsø Kommune||Vejerslev church (DA)|| tower about 1400||Romanesque granite church with Late Gothic whitened brick tower ||
|-
|↓||Torup,Fjerritslev,Rebild Kommune||Torup kirke||tower about 1500||Romanesque granite church with Late Gothic whitened brick tower ; porch about 1900||
|-
|↑||Thisted''',Thisted Kommune||church (DA)|| about 1500||yellow munk brick with granite ashley and chalk, nowadays white washed ||
|-
|↓||Bedsted,Thisted Kommune||Bedsted church||||Romanesque granite church with Late Gothic red brick tower, interior of the nave about 1500 ||
|-
|↑||Hillerslev,Thisted Kommune||Hillerslev kirke|| tower about 1500||Romanesque granite church with Late Gothic whitened brick tower ||
|-
|↓||13 km NE of Thisted,Thisted Kommune||church (DA)||Gothic 15th century||Romanesque granite church (about 1200) with Late Gothic whitened brick tower ||
|-
|↑||Hunstrup,Thisted Kommune||Hunstrup kirke||Gothic about 1500 th century||Romanesque granite church with Late Gothic whitened brick tower and porch||
|-
|↓||Lild,Thisted Kommune||Lild kirke||about 1460||munk brick & Bulbjerg stone ||
|-
|↑||Lodbjerg Sogn,Thisted Kommune||Lodbjerg church (DA)|| 1530s|| ||
|-
|↓||Ørum,Thisted Kommune||Ørum church [[:da:Ørum Kirke (Thisted Kommune)|<small>(DA stub)</small>]]|| tower about 1500|| Late Gothic red brick tower, Romanesque granite nave & choir||
|-
|↑||Øsløs,Thisted Kommune|| Øsløs Kirke|| tower about 1500||Romanesque granite nave & choir ||
|-
|↓||Østerild,Thisted Kommune||Østerild Kirke|| core about 1160||Romanesque granite church with Late Gothic whitened brick tower ||
|-
|↑||Sennels,Thisted Kommune||Hillerslev church||||Romanesque granite church with Late Gothic whitened brick tower and porch ||
|-
|↓||Sjørring,Thisted Kommune||Sjørring kirke|| tower about 1500|| Romanesque granite church with Late Gothic whitened brick tower||
|-
|↑||Tømmerby,Thisted Kommune||Tømmerby kirke||colspan="2"|nave about 1130, tower & porch late Middle Age of brick, whitened ||
|-
|↓||Vestervig,Thisted Kommune|| Vestervig abbey church||colspan="2"|Romanesque basilica of granite ashley, Late Gothic tower of brick ||
|-
|↑||Villerslev,Thisted Kommune||Villerslev kirke||||Romanesque granite church with Late Gothic whitened brick tower ||
|-
|↓||Farsø,Vesthimmerland||Farsø kirke (DA)||colspan="2"| nave & choir about 1180, tower & porch Late Gothic of brick, whitened ||
|-
|↑||Gedsted,Vesthimmerland||Gedsted church (DA)||Brick 14th century||transept and tower of brick, partly whitened ||
|-
|↓||Simested,Vesthimmerland||Simested church (DA)||brick 16th century||Romanesque nave of granite ashley 13th century ||
|-
|↑||Skivum,Vesthimmerland||Skivum kirke||||Romanesque granite church with Gothic whitened brick tower ||
|-
|↑||Vesterbølle,Vesthimmerland||Vesterbølle church (DA)||brick early 16th century||Romanesque granite church with Late Gothic whitened brick tower ||
|}

 Mid Jutland 

– Danish "Region Midtjylland" –

 South Jutland 
– Jutland part of Danish Region "Region Syddanmark"; that is much more than traditional "Sønderjylland" –

Funen
and adjacent Islands

Zealand
and adjacent Islands

 Lolland and Falster 

 England 
In England, the use of bricks for pretentious buildings began later than in continental Europe. And the collective of Gothic brick buildings differs, almost no religious buildings and very few urban ones.

 Estonia 

 Finland 

 France 

 Hauts-de-France with French Flanders 

 Alsace 

 Central France, south and west of Orléans 

In the Loir-et-Cher department, there is a small group of Gothic brick buildings. One of them even is among the most famous buildings of France, though not for its bricks.

 (Ducal) Burgundy and Franche Comté region 

In Middles Ages, the same rulers were Dukes of Burgundy as French vassals and Counts of Burgundy as vassals of the Holy Roman Empire.

 Forez 
– Between Burgundy and Languedoc –

 Southern France around Toulouse 

(*) "Our-Lady's-Assumption Church" = Église Notre-Dame-de-l'Assomption Germany See List of Gothic brick buildings in GermanyHungary
– In Hungary, there is much more hidden than visible medieval brick. During the 145 years of Ottoman occupation, many churches fell in ruins. At about 1700 they were restored, inclusively of plastering, which need not necessary have existed before. In ruins of the Turkish wars and of World War II, brick can be visible, though these buildings had been plastered in their time of function. –

 Italy 

 Abruzzo 

 Emilia-Romagna 

 Liguria 

 Lombardy 

 Marche 

 Piedmont 

 Tuscany 

 Veneto and Friuli-Venezia Giulia 

 Latvia 

 Lithuania 

 Netherlands See List of Gothic brick buildings in the Netherlands Poland See List of Gothic brick buildings in Poland Russia 

 Historical Russia 

 Kaliningrad exclave 

 Slovakia 

 Sweden 
Until 1658, Malmö, Lund and Helsingborg were Danish.

 Switzerland 

Though brick generally is not typical for medieval Swiss architecture, there are also some Gothic brick buildings in Switzerland, and some more have disappeared.

 Ukraine 
Except of Lutsk Castle, all buildings are not very far from the current Polish border, though Gothic buildings also can be found in Lviv and Stryi, some of them looking like plastered brick buildings.

See also
 European Route of Brick Gothic

Bibliography
Angela Pfotenhauer, Florian Monheim, Carola Nathan: Backsteingotik. Monumente-Edition. Monumente-Publikation der Deutschen Stiftung Denkmalschutz, Bonn 2000, 
Marianne Mehling (ed.): Knaurs Kulturführer in Farbe Estland, Lettland, Litauen. München 1993. 
Marianne Mehling (ed.): Knaurs Kulturführer in Farbe: Finnland''. München 1988.

References

External links

01
.
Gothic•
Gothic, Brick
Hanseatic League